Tukmak-Karan (Tuqmak-Qaran) is a rural locality (a village) in Kakrybashevsky Selsoviet, Tuymazinsky District, Bashkortostan, Russia. The population was 119 as of 2010. There is 1 street.

Geography 
Tukmak-Karan is located 54 km east of Tuymazy (the district's administrative centre) by road.

References 

Rural localities in Tuymazinsky District